This Is Our Music is the third and final studio album by American indie rock band Galaxie 500, released in 1990 on Rough Trade Records.

In 2010, the album was re-issued and peaked at number 18 on the UK Independent Album Breakers Chart.

Track listing

Personnel
Credits adapted from liner notes.

Galaxie 500
 Damon Krukowski – drums, backup vocals
 Dean Wareham – guitar, vocals
 Naomi Yang – bass guitar, vocals on "Listen, the Snow Is Falling"

Additional personnel
 Mark Kramer – production, engineering, mirage, "cheap flute", backup vocals
 Norman Gholson – photography
 Ray Agony – photography

Charts

Release history

References

External links
 
 

1990 albums
Galaxie 500 albums
Albums produced by Kramer (musician)
Rough Trade Records albums
Rykodisc albums
Domino Recording Company albums